Parviphos is a genus of sea snails, marine gastropod mollusks in the family Buccinidae, the true whelks.

This genus has become a synonym of Antillophos Woodring, 1928

Species
Species within the genus Parviphos include:
 Parviphos adelus (Schwengel, 1942): synonym of Antillophos adelus (Schwengel, 1942)
 Parviphos chalcedonius Watters, 2009: synonyum of Antillophos chalcedonius (Watters, 2009)
 Parviphos nigricostatus (Reeve, 1846): synonym of Sinetectula nigricostata (Reeve, 1846) (new combination)

References

External links
 Watters, G. T. (2009). A revision of the western Atlantic Ocean genera Anna, Antillophos, Bailya, Caducifer, Monostiolum, and Parviphos, with description of a new genus, Dianthiphos, and notes on Engina and Hesperisternia Gastropoda: Buccinidae: Pisaniinae) and Cumia (Colubrariidae). The Nautilus. 123(4): 225-275
 Galindo, L. A.; Puillandre, N.; Utge, J.; Lozouet, P.; Bouchet, P. (2016). The phylogeny and systematics of the Nassariidae revisited (Gastropoda, Buccinoidea). Molecular Phylogenetics and Evolution. 99: 337-353

Buccinidae